Hridya Ram Thani (Nepali:हृदयराम थानी) is a Nepalese politician. He was elected to the Pratinidhi Sabha, Surkhet Constituency 2, in the 1999 election on behalf of the Nepali Congress.

References

Living people
Nepali Congress politicians from Karnali Province
Place of birth missing (living people)
Nepal MPs 1999–2002
Members of the 2nd Nepalese Constituent Assembly
Nepal MPs 2022–present
1960 births